The Prescott Montezuma Federals were a professional baseball team  in the United States. The team was based in Prescott, Arizona and a member of the independent Freedom Pro Baseball League, which was not affiliated with Minor League Baseball. They played their home games at Roughrider Park.

2013 roster

References

External links 
 Prescott Montezuma Federals

Freedom Pro Baseball League teams
Baseball teams established in 2012
Professional baseball teams in Arizona
Defunct independent baseball league teams
Defunct baseball teams in Arizona
Baseball teams disestablished in 2013